Drew Michael Carlton (born September 8, 1995) is an American professional baseball pitcher in the San Diego Padres organization. He made his MLB debut with the Detroit Tigers in 2021.

Career

Detroit Tigers
Carlton attended George Jenkins High School in Lakeland, Florida, and Florida State University. The Detroit Tigers drafted him in the 32nd round of the 2017 MLB draft. In his first season with the organization, Carlton progressed quickly, earning a late-season call-up to the Single-A West Michigan Whitecaps by the end of the year following 14 innings of two-run ball in Low-A Connecticut. Carlton's successes would continue the following season, pitching with the High-A Lakeland Flying Tigers for the majority of the year with a 2.38 ERA over 56.2 innings in 34 appearances with a 1.01 WHIP. He would move up to the Double-A Erie SeaWolves that season, where he made five appearances, allowing two earned runs in 11 innings pitched.

He remained in Erie for the entire 2019 season, serving as the team's primary closer, going 19/20 in save opportunities with a 1.46 ERA in 68 innings pitched. Carlton's WHIP was under one (0.97) and he allowed just a .200 batting average against while striking out 65. 

In 2020, Carlton, like many minor league players, missed the minor league season due to the COVID-19 pandemic, however, that winter, Carlton would move out to the Dominican Republic to play for Leones del Escogido in the Dominican Winter League. In the Winter League, Carlton gave up just nine hits, one walk, and one run over 14.1 innings. 

To begin the 2021 season, Carlton pitched for the Triple-A Toledo Mud Hens. He pitched 49 innings with a 3.12 ERA, ten walks and 48 strikeouts. 

Carlton was called up and made his Major League debut on September 4, 2021. In his debut he threw only one pitch, retiring Delino DeShields Jr. with a runner at third and two outs. At the time of his call-up, 17 of the 31 players drafted ahead of Carlton by the Tigers in 2017 were no longer playing in the league. On November 9, 2021, Carlton was outrighted off of the 40-man roster. 

He was assigned to Triple-A Toledo to begin the 2022 season. In 15.0 innings of work, he recorded a 3.60 ERA and 30.2% strikeout rate. On May 20, 2022, Carlton had his contract selected to the 40-man and active roster. On July 15, 2022, Carlton was designated for assignment. He cleared waivers and was sent outright to Triple-A Toledo on July 19. On October 13, Carlton elected free agency.

San Diego Padres
On December 12, 2022, Carlton signed a minor league deal with an invite to spring training with the San Diego Padres.

References

External links

1995 births
Living people
Sportspeople from Lakeland, Florida
Baseball players from Florida
Major League Baseball pitchers
Detroit Tigers players
Florida State Seminoles baseball players
Gulf Coast Tigers players
Connecticut Tigers players
West Michigan Whitecaps players
Lakeland Flying Tigers players
Erie SeaWolves players
Leones del Escogido players
Toledo Mud Hens players
American expatriate baseball players in the Dominican Republic